The Benaud–Qadir Trophy is a Test cricket series played between the men's cricket teams of Australia and Pakistan. It was launched in March 2022 during Australia's tour of Pakistan. The trophy is named after Richie Benaud and Abdul Qadir, who were both prolific cricketers and exponents of leg spin bowling for their respective nations. Both nations have shared a formidable cricket rivalry at times. 

Under the agreement reached between Cricket Australia (CA) and the Pakistan Cricket Board (PCB), all bilateral Test series between the two teams from 2022 onward would be played under the Benaud–Qadir Trophy. The tours will be scheduled under the ICC Future Tours Programme and will form part of the ICC World Test Championship.

Background

Below is a summary of all Test series played prior to the Benaud–Qadir Trophy between Australia and Pakistan from 1956 to 2019, covering a 63-year period. Australia and Pakistan competed against each other in 25 Test series, with Australia winning 13, Pakistan winning seven, and five Test series ending in a draw. In terms of Test matches, the two sides played against each other a total of 66 times, out of which Australia won 33 matches, Pakistan won 15 matches, and 18 matches were drawn. The first ever Test match between the two sides was played in October 1956 in Karachi, which Pakistan won by nine wickets.

Pakistan hosted 12 series, from 1956 onward; between Australia's tours of 1998 and 2022, all of Pakistan's home series were held on neutral venues like the United Arab Emirates (UAE), Sri Lanka and England due to the security situation in Pakistan post-2002. Australia hosted  13 series, from 1964 onward. 

Pakistan played Test matches against Australia on Australian soil on 37 occasions, out of which they won four times and drew seven times but did not win a Test series; they also played Australia in home matches held on neutral venues on nine occasions, in which they defeated Australia four times and drew once, including prominent series victories in 2014 and 2018 in the UAE. Pakistan clinched five of their seven series victories in home conditions – 1956, 1980, 1982, 1988 and 1994, winning seven and drawing 10 of their total of 20 home games.

Of their 20 matches played against Pakistan on Pakistani soil, Australia won three times and drew 10 times, including historical series victories in 1959 and 1998; they also defeated Pakistan in neutral venues four times and drew once out of nine occasions, including a series victory in 2002 in Sri Lanka and the UAE. Australia seized 10 of their 13 series victories in home conditions – 1972–73, 1981, 1983–84, 1990, 1995, 1999, 2004–05, 2009–10, 2016–17 and 2019, winning 26 and drawing seven of their total of 37 home games.

Five Test series between Australia and Pakistan were drawn. Of these, the series of October 1964 was held in Pakistan; the series of December 1964, 1976–77 and 1979 were held in Australia, while the series of 2010 was held in the neutral venues of England.

List of Benaud–Qadir Trophy series

Match venues
The following is a full list of venues for Test matches played between Pakistan and Australia since 1956, along with match records. Venues that have featured in the Benaud–Qadir Trophy are in green. Venues that no longer host matches are in red.

Media coverage
The series is broadcast through PTV Sports in Pakistan and Fox Sports in Australia. Globally, coverage has been available via Sony in the rest of South Asia, Etisalat in the Middle East and North Africa, Sky Sports in the United Kingdom, Sky Sport in New Zealand, SuperSport in Sub-Saharan Africa, Flow Sports in the Caribbean and Willow in North America, with ICC TV and Daraz serving as the live streaming partners.

See also

 Australia–Pakistan relations
 Border–Gavaskar Trophy
 Warne–Muralitharan Trophy

References

External links
 Benaud-Qadir Trophy at ESPNcricinfo

Australia in international cricket
Cricket awards and rankings
Cricket rivalries
Pakistan in international cricket
Recurring sporting events established in 2022
Test cricket competitions
Australia–Pakistan relations